The 1153 papal election followed the death of Pope Eugene III and resulted in the election of Pope Anastasius IV.

Election of Anastasius IV
Pope Eugenius III died on 8 July 1153 at Tivoli. On 12 July the cardinals elected as his successor cardinal Corrado Demetri della Suburra, bishop of Sabina and dean of the College of Cardinals, who was 80 years old. He took the name Anastasius IV and was crowned on the same day, probably in Rome.

Cardinal-electors
There were 35 cardinals in the Sacred College of Cardinals in July 1153, but it seems that no more than 30 (perhaps even fewer) participated in the election:

Six electors were created by Pope Innocent II, five by Pope Celestine II, six by Pope Lucius II, twelve by Pope Eugenius III and one by Pope Paschalis II.

Absentees

Notes

Sources
Ian Stuart Robinson, The Papacy 1073-1198. Continuity and Innovation, Cambridge University Press 1990
Philipp Jaffé, Regesta pontificum Romanorum ab condita Ecclesia ad annum post Christum natum MCXCVIII, vol. II, Leipzig 1888
Johannes M. Brixius, Die Mitglieder des Kardinalkollegiums von 1130-1181, Berlin 1912
Barbara Zenker, Die Mitglieder des Kardinalkollegiums von 1130 bis 1159, Würzburg 1964
Klaus Ganzer, Die Entwicklung des auswärtigen Kardinalats im hohen Mittelalter, Tübingen 1963

12th-century elections
1153
1153
1153 in Europe
12th-century Catholicism